Elvas is a Portuguese municipality, former episcopal city and frontier fortress of easternmost central Portugal, located in the district of Portalegre in Alentejo. The city itself had a population of 16,640 .

Elvas is among the finest examples of intensive usage of the trace italienne (star fort) in military architecture, and has been a World Heritage Site since 30June 2012. The inscribed site name is Garrison Border Town of Elvas and its Fortifications.

History 

It was wrested from the Moors by Afonso I of Portugal in 1166 but was temporarily recaptured before its final occupation by the Portuguese in 1226. In 1570 it became an episcopal see, the Roman Catholic Diocese of Elvas, until 1818. The late Gothic Our Lady of the Assumption Cathedral, which has many traces of Moorish influence in its architecture, dates from the reign of Manuel I of Portugal (1495–1521).

It was defended by seven bastions and the two forts of Santa Luzia and the Nossa Senhora da Graça Fort. From 1642 it was the chief frontier fortress south of the Tagus, which withstood sieges by the Spanish in 1659, 1711, and 1801. Elvas was the site of the Battle of the Lines of Elvas in 1659, during which the garrison and citizens of the city assisted in the rout of a Spanish Army. The Napoleonic French under Marshal Junot took it in March 1808 during the Peninsular War, but evacuated it in August after the conclusion of the Convention of Sintra. The fortress of Campo Maior  to the northeast is known for its Napoleonic era siege by the French and relief by the British under Marshal Beresford in 1811, an exploit commemorated in a ballad by Sir Walter Scott.

UNESCO site 
The Garrison Border Town of Elvas and its Fortifications were added to the list of UNESCO World Heritage Sites in 2012.

The site, extensively fortified from the 17th to 19th centuries, represents the largest bulwarked dry ditch system in the world. Within its walls, the town contains barracks and other military buildings as well as churches and monasteries. While Elvas contains remains dating back to the 10th century, its fortification began during the Portuguese Restoration War. The fortifications played a major role in the Battle of the Lines of Elvas in 1659. The fortifications were designed by Dutch Jesuit Padre João Piscásio Cosmander and represent the best surviving example of the Dutch school of fortifications anywhere. The site consists the following:

 Amoreira Aqueduct, built to withstand long sieges.
 Historic Centre
  and the covered way
 Nossa Senhora da Graça Fort
 Fortlet of São Mamede
 
 Fortlet of São Domingos

Climate

Civil Parishes 
Administratively, the municipality is divided in seven civil parishes (freguesias):
 Assunção, Ajuda, Salvador e Santo Ildefonso
 Barbacena e Vila Fernando
 Caia, São Pedro e Alcáçova
 Santa Eulália
 São Brás e São Lourenço
 São Vicente e Ventosa
 Terrugem e Vila Boim

Sister cities 
  Badajoz, Extremadura, Spain
 Olivença, Disputed
  Campo Maior, Alentejo, Portugal

Notable people 

 Manuel Rodrigues Coelho (ca. 1555 – 1635) a Portuguese organist and composer.
 João de Fontes Pereira de Melo (1780–1856) a politician, a general and twice colonial governor of Cape Verde
 José Travassos Valdez, 1st Count of Bonfim (1787–1862) a Portuguese soldier and statesman.
 Fortunato José Barreiros (1797–1885) a colonial governor of Cape Verde and military architect.
 Adelaide Cabete (1867–1935) a Portuguese feminist and republican.
 Virgínia Quaresma (1882–1973) an early radical, feminist, lesbian journalist 
 Sofia Pomba Guerra (1906–1976) a feminist, opponent of the Estado Novo government in Portugal and an activist in the anti-colonial movements of Mozambique and Guinea-Bissau.
 José António Rondão Almeida (born 1945) a Portuguese politician & Mayor of Elvas
 Toni Vidigal (born 1975), Jorge Vidigal (born 1978) & André Vidigal (born 1998) Angolan football brothers
 Raquel Guerra (born 1985) a Portuguese singer and actress.
 Henrique Sereno (born 1985) a Portuguese former footballer with 236 club caps

Gallery

References

External links 

 UNESCO, Garrison Border Town of Elvas and its Fortifications

 
Cities in Portugal
World Heritage Sites in Portugal
Populated places in Portalegre District
Municipalities of Portalegre District